Following the outbreak of the Somali Civil War in 1991, the task of running schools in Somalia was initially taken up by community education committees established in 94% of the local schools (Ihebuzor, Noel 2005). Numerous problems had arisen with regard to access to education in rural areas and along gender lines, quality of educational provisions, responsiveness of school curricula, educational standards and controls, management and planning capacity, and financing. To address these concerns, the intellectual people established schools and most of these schools follow the national educational policy for primary, intermediate and secondary schools.

However, Adult Commercial Secondary School (ACSS) was established in November 2006; by a group of academicians in Hodan District, Mogadishu-Somalia. Currently, the school provides business and accounting subjects as well as the introductory of science subjects and computer fundamentals. The first batch graduated in the academic year of 2008–2009 with 51 students including male and female, and at the moment the school consists of two branches; one is located in Mogadishu, the capital of the state, and the other center in Middle Shabelle Region in central zones of Somalia.

References 
 Ihebuzor, Noel (2005 01 31).  "EC and UNICEF join hands to support education in Somalia". United Nations Children's Fund (UNICEF).  Retrieved 2011-03-01. http://www.reliefweb.int/rw/RWB.NSF/db900SID/VBOL-696HBA?OpenDocument.

Schools in Somalia
Educational institutions established in 2006
2006 establishments in Somalia